Youcef Abdi (Kabyle: Yusef Ɛabdi) (born 7 December 1977) is an Australian athlete who specializes in the 3000 m steeplechase. He changed his allegiance from Algeria in 2000.  Since his retirement from Athletics he has found a new calling and  currently plays soccer in the over 35's for Coogee United alongside club legend Ming Ting-Little.

Competition record

Notes

References

1977 births
Living people
Australian male middle-distance runners
Australian male steeplechase runners
Australian people of Algerian descent
Athletes (track and field) at the 2002 Commonwealth Games
Athletes (track and field) at the 2006 Commonwealth Games
Athletes (track and field) at the 2010 Commonwealth Games
Athletes (track and field) at the 2008 Summer Olympics
Athletes (track and field) at the 2012 Summer Olympics
Olympic athletes of Australia
Place of birth missing (living people)
People from Azazga
World Athletics Championships athletes for Australia
Commonwealth Games medallists in athletics
Commonwealth Games bronze medallists for Australia
Kabyle people
Medallists at the 2002 Commonwealth Games